Ataxia variegata is a species of beetle in the family Cerambycidae. It was described by Warren Samuel Fisher in 1925. It is known from Cuba.

References

Ataxia (beetle)
Beetles described in 1925
Endemic fauna of Cuba